The following is a list of the MTV Europe Music Award winners and nominees for Best Worldwide Act.

2010's

References

MTV Europe Music Awards
Awards established in 2011